Gareth Jones  is a British film and television director and screenwriter, owner and joint CEO, with Fiona Howe, of independent production company Scenario Films.

Early life and education
Gareth Jones was born in London, son of BBC Foreign Correspondent Ivor Jones and Jane Ann Sterndale Bennett.  He is the grandson of the actress Athene Seyler and great-great-grandson of the composer William Sterndale Bennett. 

He was educated at Westminster School and St. John's College, Cambridge where he read modern languages.   After graduation in 1973, he trained for a year at the Guildhall School of Music and Drama.

In 2011 he was awarded his PhD from Cambridge University for his thesis Rites of Recuperation: Film and the Holocaust in Germany and the Balkans.

Career

1970s–1980s
He first joined Prospect Theatre Company, where he worked with Kenny McBain, directing Shakespeare, Brecht, Strindberg, and Chekhov.

He was director of productions at bilingual Welsh/English touring company Theatr yr Ymylon, and between 1977 and 1980 worked as a freelance theatre director for the Royal Court Theatre with Stuart Burge, and Theatr Clwyd  where he directed his own plays My People (based on the short stories of Caradoc Evans) and Solidarity  During the 1980s he published two novels, Lord of Misrule and Noble Savage.
 
After training as a television director at HTV Wales, he joined Granada Television at the invitation of producer Bill Podmore for whom he directed Coronation Street and comedy drama series Brass, starring Timothy West, Caroline Blakiston and Barbara Ewing, the second series of which he also produced.   

From 1984 to 1987 he worked as a freelance writer/director for BBC television drama, writing  drama series Fighting Back starring Hazel O'Connor and five-part drama Shalom Salaam, a Jewish-Muslim love story starring Mamta Kaash, Toby Rolt, Ayub Khan-Din and Charlotte Cornwell, which he also directed.

Other television directing credits include The Trial of Klaus Barbie (1987) which was based on court transcripts and screened shortly after the verdict, Watch with Mother and Seeing in the Dark for BBC Drama, and Seduction – Tell Me More for Channel 4 for whom he also shot and co-wrote the three-part documentary Born of the One Father (Au Nom du Même Père) in 1980–81.

1990s–present
Jones has worked as a screenwriter in Europe, where his credits include television movies such as Forbidden Zone (Verbotene Zone, 1995) and Not Without You (Nicht Ohne Dich, 2001) for German broadcaster ZDF,  The Gift of Life (Un Cadeau: la Vie) for France 2,  Joseph, Mary Magdalen, Thomas and Saul of Tarsus for Mediaset in Italy, and award-winning feature film  (2000), starring Ulrich Tukur.

Since 2007 he has run feature film development initiative Babylon, aimed at promoting cultural diversity within the independent film sector in Europe, and to provide an international platform for emerging filmmakers.

Jones wrote and directed a trilogy of feature films known collectively as the D-Trilogy, Desire (2009), Delight (2013) starring Jeanne Balibar, and Delirium (2016). Delight was screened at the 35th Moscow International Film Festival and at the Wales One World Film Festival.

Awards and nominations

Filmography

Theatre and radio

Selected publications

References

External links 
 
 
 Babylon feature film development

1951 births
Living people
Alumni of St John's College, Cambridge
Film directors from London
British television directors
British screenwriters